Yermakovo is a rural locality (a settlement) in Leskovskoye Rural Settlement, Vologodsky District, Vologda Oblast, Russia. The population was 1,517 as of 2002. There are 29 streets.

Geography 
Yermakovo is located 14 km southwest of Vologda (the district's administrative centre) by road. Skorbezhevo is the nearest rural locality.

References 

Rural localities in Vologodsky District